Willard Bond (June 7, 1926 in Colfax, Washington – May 19, 2012 in Yountville, California) was an American painter who was particularly known for his watercolor and oil paintings of yachting life. Raised in Lewiston, Idaho, he served in the United States Navy during World War II before studying art at the Art Institute of Chicago and the Pratt Institute in New York.

References

1926 births
2012 deaths
20th-century American painters
American male painters
21st-century American painters
People from Colfax, Washington
Pratt Institute alumni
School of the Art Institute of Chicago alumni
20th-century American male artists